This is a list of points in the Philippines that are farther north, south, east, or west than any other location in the country. Also included are extreme points in elevation, extreme distances, and other points of geographic interest.

Republic Act No. 9522 of 2009, defines the archipelagic baselines of the Philippines.

Location points 
 Northernmost point: Mavulis (Y'Ami) Island, Itbayat, Batanes 
 Southernmost point: Frances Reef, Sitangkai, Tawi-Tawi 
 Southernmost island: Saluag Island, Sibutu, Tawi-Tawi 
 Easternmost point: Pusan Point, Caraga, Davao Oriental 
 Westernmost point: Balabac Great Reef 7°54′36.35″N 116°53′16.64″E

Cities 
 Northernmost city: Laoag
 Southernmost city: General Santos
 Easternmost city: Bislig
 Westernmost city: Puerto Princesa

Luzon Island 
 Northernmost point: Maira-ira, Pagudpud, Ilocos Norte 
 Southernmost point: Bon-Ot Big, Matnog, Sorsogon

Mindanao Island 
 Northernmost point: Punta Bilar, Surigao City, Surigao del Norte
 Southernmost point: Tinaca Point, Jose Abad Santos, Davao Occidental

Altitude 
 Highest: Mount Apo, Mindanao  
 Lowest: Galathea Depth, Philippine Trench, . It is the third-deepest in the world after the Challenger Deep, Marianas Trench and the Tonga Trench.

Highest attainable by transportation
 Road: Kiangan-Tinoc-Buguias Road, Eheb, Tinoc, Ifugao

See also
 Geography of the Philippines

References 

Philippines
Geography of the Philippines
Lists of landforms of the Philippines